Antaeotricha isosticta is a moth in the family Depressariidae. It was described by Edward Meyrick in 1932. It is found in Mexico.

References

Moths described in 1932
isosticta
Moths of Central America
Taxa named by Edward Meyrick